Arteshbod Bahram Aryana; also spelled Bahram Ariana born Hossein Manouchehri; 17 March 1906 – 21 June 1985) was a top Iranian military commander during the reign of Mohammed Reza Pahlavi and an Iranian nationalist and humanist. Professor Monica M. Ringer described Aryana as probably the most notorious “converted Zoroastrian” of the Pahlavi era.

Biography
He was born on 17 March 1906 in Tehran from a Georgian mother, whose ancestor was King Heraclius II, and from a judge father, Sadr-ed-din. His name was Hossein Manouchehri, which he would change it to Bahram Aryana in 1950. Professor Monica M. Ringer has described Aryana as probably the most notorious “converted Zoroastrian” of the Pahlavi era.

He was educated in France at the École Supérieur de Guerre and received his PhD in 1955 from the Faculty of Law of Paris with his thesis "Napoleon et l'Orient" (published in 1957). Aryana is known to have styled himself on Napoleon and dressed in the Imperial French style.

After the Anglo-Soviet invasion of Iran in 1941 during World War II, he went on with armed struggle and resisted the occupation before being arrested by the British forces. He was instrumental in many of the nationalist policies in the 1950-1960s. During the military campaign of 1964-65 he successfully pacified rebellious tribes in the south of Iran (Pars, Isfahan and Khuzestan) stirred-up by Ayatollah Ruhollah Khomeini, without shedding blood.

Following his military success in the south, General Aryana was named Chief of Staff of the Shah's Army, position he maintained from 1965 to 1969.

During his posting as Chief of Staff, he met with various head of states including Richard Nixon, who received him at the White House, Yitzhak Rabin (then the Chief of Staff of the Israel Defense Forces), who received him in Israel and General de Gaulle, during his visit to Iran.

Aryana left Iran in 1969 on the order of the Shah. This was due to the Arvand Rud (Shatt al-Arab) crisis.

Unlike his fellow Arteshbod and exiled leader, Gholam-Ali Oveissi. Aryana was 'beloved' by the Kurdish population of Iran from his time as the military governor of Kurdistan.

He died in exile in Paris in June 1985 and is buried at the Montparnasse cemetery.

His last published book,  was a call for unity against the obscurantist forces driving Khomeini and the mullahs' fundamentalist revolution.

Party affiliation
Aryana described himself as being an Iranian nationalist and moderate socialist, not a monarchist. Although he received a great deal of support from monarchists who considered him to be a supporter. Aryana held dual membership of Aria Party and SUMKA.

He founded Azadegan, a nationalist opposition group which had "developed a full command staff structure and support from all nationalist elements from the moderate left to the monarchists". while in exile in Paris.

Aryana combined his forces with not just Gholam Ali Oveissi but also Shapour Bakhtiar, Ahmad Madani and Ali Amini. Azadegan, meaning Born Free, was an anti-Khomeini movement which claimed as many as 12,000 followers in Iran, many of them in the armed forces. The daring seizing by Azadegan's officers of Tabarzin, an Iranian Navy's Combattante II class fast attack craft just built by France and en route to Iran while in the Mediterranean in August 1981, attracted media attention to Azadegan and its members' armed resistance against the clerical regime of Iran.

References

External links

20th-century Iranian politicians
1906 births
1985 deaths
Converts to Zoroastrianism
Exiles of the Iranian Revolution in France
Grand Officiers of the Légion d'honneur
Imperial Iranian Armed Forces four-star generals
Iranian collaborators with Nazi Germany
Iranian emigrants to France
Iranian people of Georgian descent
Prisoners and detainees of the British military
People from Tonekabon
SUMKA politicians
Politicians from Tehran
École Spéciale Militaire de Saint-Cyr alumni